The discography of Hüsker Dü, an American punk rock band, consists of six studio albums, two live albums, one compilation album, two extended plays, and ten singles. The band was formed by Bob Mould (guitar, vocals), Grant Hart (drums, vocals), and Greg Norton (bass guitar) in 1979. Their first album release was Land Speed Record, a live album released through New Alliance Records. The band released its first studio album, Everything Falls Apart on its own label (Reflex Records) the following year. Hüsker Dü signed with SST Records in 1983, and released its next three albums with that label. The Warner Music Group released the band's last two studio albums. Hüsker Dü broke up in 1987. The band released 6 albums, including two double albums, between January 1983 and January 1987.

Albums

Studio albums

Live albums

Compilation albums

Extended plays

Singles

Compilation appearances

Music videos
"Makes No Sense at All"/ "Love Is All Around" (1985)
"Don't Want to Know If You Are Lonely" (1986)
"Could You Be the One?" (1987)

Video albums
Live from the Camden Palace (Live from London UK TV show on 14 May 1985, released on DVD on 5 February 2007)

References
General

Specific

Discographies of American artists
Punk rock group discographies